Apsectus araneorum is a species of carpet beetle in the family Dermestidae. It is found in North America.

References

 Beal, R. S. Jr. (2003). "Annotated Checklist of Nearctic Dermestidae with Revised Key to the Genera". The Coleopterists Bulletin, vol. 57, no. 4, 391–404.

Further reading

 Arnett, R.H. Jr., M. C. Thomas, P. E. Skelley and J. H. Frank. (eds.). (2002). American Beetles, Volume II: Polyphaga: Scarabaeoidea through Curculionoidea. CRC Press LLC, Boca Raton, FL.
 Arnett, Ross H. (2000). American Insects: A Handbook of the Insects of America North of Mexico. CRC Press.
 Richard E. White. (1983). Peterson Field Guides: Beetles. Houghton Mifflin Company.

Dermestidae
Beetles described in 1959